The Arrow 1000 is a four-cylinder, horizontally opposed, two-stroke, single- or dual-ignition, aircraft engine that was designed for float-equipped ultralight aircraft by Arrow SNC of Italy.

The Arrow family of engines are modular in design and share the same pistons, cylinders and gearboxes assembled around different crankcase designs, giving one-, two- or four-cylinder engines. Arrow engines are no longer in production.

Development
The 1000 is a conventional four-cylinder engine that weighs . The engine features single or optional dual ignition, reed valve induction, free air cooling, tuned exhaust system, slide venturi-type Bing carburetors, fuel pump, Nikasil cylinder coatings. The engine was offered with a gearbox reduction system that included a one-way clutch. Starting is electric starter with no provision for a recoil starter.

The 1000 produces , runs on premium unleaded auto fuel and has a recommended time between overhaul of 300 hours.

The tuned exhaust supplied with the engine has been criticized as "cumbersome" and needing modification to fit most aircraft.

Specifications (Arrow 1000)

See also

References

Arrow SNC engines
Air-cooled aircraft piston engines
Two-stroke aircraft piston engines